The 1970–71 Yugoslav Ice Hockey League season was the 29th season of the Yugoslav Ice Hockey League, the top level of ice hockey in Yugoslavia. 11 teams participated in the league, and Jesenice won the championship.

First round

Final round

Group A

Group B

Group C

External links
 Season on hrhockey

Yugoslav
Yugoslav Ice Hockey League seasons
1970–71 in Yugoslav ice hockey